The Chișinău trolleybus system forms an important part of the public transport network in Chișinău, the capital of Moldova. The system was created shortly after the end of the World War II to replace the old electric tram system that suffered extensive damage during the war. Along with the network of minibuses known as rutierele, it forms the backbone of the Chișinău transport system, with the average daily ridership reaching 250,000 passengers per day.

History
The history of the trolleybus network in Chișinău goes back to 1949 when the city council took the decision to introduce it as a substitute for the tram network that was heavily damaged during World War II and could only be rebuilt to a limited extent. The first line connecting the Chişinău Railway Station with the University of Medicine ran along the Stephen the Great boulevard, where the former tram tracks were removed, and was served by six MTB-82D units. In 1959 the tram depot was transferred to serve the trolleybus system that comprised over 50 units at that time, and by 1961 trolleybuses had completely replaced the trams. The second and the third depots were introduced into service in 1966 and 1986, respectively.

Lines
The trolleybus network consists of 22 lines covering all the city districts and the suburb of Durlești.

Fleet

The fleet consists mainly of the various modification of the Soviet-built ZiU-9 and the recently purchased low-floor vehicles AKSM-321 manufactured by Belkommunmash in Belarus (Chișinău is the third-largest user of this model, after Minsk and Moscow). In addition, the network also operates a number of the Czech-produced Škoda 14Tr  (popular with the drivers) and Ukrainian-built YuMZ-T2.

Payment system
Every vehicle has a fare collector who sells single-ride tickets valid for this particular ride only. Alternatively, one can purchase a monthly ticket, valid for a calendar month. A single-ride ticket costs (since September '22) 6 MDL, and the price of the monthly pass is 234 MDL. There are also: monthly ticket for scholars and students - 70 MDL, ticket for 15 days - 100 MDL, monthly ticket for students with social privileges - 70 MDL, monthly ticket for economic agents - 320 MDL.

References

External links

 
 
Regia Transport Electric Chisinau Facebook Page

Chisinau
Chisinau
Transport in Chișinău